Achille Marie Gaston Floquet (15 December 1847, Épinal – 7 October 1920, Nancy) was a French mathematician, best known for his work in mathematical analysis, especially in theory of differential equations.

See also
Floquet theory

External links

 

1847 births
1920 deaths
People from Épinal
École Normale Supérieure alumni
19th-century French mathematicians